A buzzard is a bird of prey.

Buzzard may also refer to:

Arts and entertainment

Film
 Buzzard (film), a 2014 American independent film
 Buzz Buzzard, animated cartoon character from 1948 to 1972

Literature
 Der Busant (The Buzzard), a Middle High German verse narrative
 The Buzzards, 1969 novel by American author Janet Burroway
 The Buzzards and Other Poems, 1921 collection by English author Martin Armstrong

Music
 Dr. Buzzard's Original Savannah Band, New York City bank from the late 1970s
 The Honey Buzzards, English band from the early 1990s
 Leyton Buzzards (known as The Buzzards), British rock band from the 1970s
 Los Buzzardos (also known as The Buzzards), a backup band of American musician Jack White
 Tucky Buzzard, British hard rock band from the early 1970s
 "Buzzards", a song by the Sword from the 2015 album High Country

People
 Buzzard baronets, a title in the Baronetage of the United Kingdom
 Farquhar Buzzard (1871–1945), British physician son of Thomas Buzzard (1831-1919) a neurologist
 Sir Anthony Buzzard, 2nd Baronet (1902–1972), British Navy officer
 Sir Anthony Buzzard, 3rd Baronet (born 1935), British theologian 
 Kevin Buzzard (born 1968), British mathematician
 Leyton Buzzard (born 1997), English professional wrestler, born Arthur Byrne
 Robert Buzzard (born 1942), American wrestler
 R. W. Buzzard, American judge
 Thomas Buzzard (1831–1919), English doctor
 Ulysses G. Buzzard (1865–1939), American soldier and Medal of Honor recipient
 Olivier Levasseur (c. 1689–1730), French pirate, nicknamed La Buse ("The Buzzard")

Places
 Buzzard oil field, in the North Sea
 Buzzard Point, urbanized area between the Potomac and Anacostia Rivers, Washington, D.C.
 Buzzard Roost, Alabama, an unincorporated community in Colbert County, Alabama
 Buzzards Bay (disambiguation), several places
 Leighton Buzzard, a town in Bedfordshire, England

Transportation

Aircraft
 Buzzman L'il Buzzard, Canadian ultralight aircraft
 Luton Buzzard, British single-seat, open cockpit ultralight aircraft from the 1930s
 Martinsyde Buzzard, British World War I era biplane fighter
 Redback Buzzard, Australian helicopter design
 Rolls-Royce Buzzard, British piston aero engine from the 1920s
 Snyder Buzzard, American light sport aircraft of the 1930s

Ships
 , a list of ships with this name
 Sarych ("Buzzard"), Russian name for the Sovremennyy-class destroyer

Other uses 
 Buzzard Coulee meteorite, fell in November 2008 over Saskatchewan, Canada 
 Buzzard lope, a dance from the 1890s in the southern United States 
 Buzzards Bay (horse), a racehorse active 2005–2008
 El Paso Buzzards, a professional ice hockey team
 Jefferson City Buzzards, a marching club in New Orleans
 State v. Buzzard, an 1842 Second-Amendment legal case in the United States
 WMMS (100.7 FM), a radio station in Cleveland, Ohio, branded "The Buzzard"

See also